A. polyclada may refer to:

 Ahnfeltiopsis polyclada, a red algae
 Angelica polyclada, a perennial plant